Maureen Murphy may refer to:

 Maureen Murphy (politician) (1952–2008), politician in Illinois
 Maureen Murphy (comedian), Australian comedian and actress
 Maureen Murphy (scientist), cancer researcher at The Wistar Institute
 Maureen Murphy (swimmer) (1939–2019), American swimmer